Vera Lucia Fernandes de Paiva da Silva is a Portuguese engineer and the chief technology officer (CTO) at General Electric (GE) grid solutions part of GE Renewable Energy business. She is one of the few women to hold a chief technology officer position at General Electric. She works on electricity grids technology and renewable energy integration.

Early life and education 
As a child Silva visited a large hydro power plant and this sparked her interest for electricity systems. Silva studied electrical engineering and computer science at the University of Porto. She earned a bachelor's degree in 1999 and a master's degree in 2003 both in electrical engineering. She moved to the United Kingdom for her doctoral studies, earning a PhD in the electrical and electronics engineering in 2010.

Research and career 
She worked as a lecturer and data scientist at the Polytechnic Institute of Porto. After completing her doctorate, Silva joined EDF R&D in France, where she directed their program on Energy Systems and Markets.  Silva is the chief technology officer at General Electric (GE) grid solutions, where she leads 3,400 engineers around the world. She is one of the few women to be made technology leader. At General Electric, Silva works on new electricity grid technology  She believes the future will involve more sustainable and flexible technologies, integrating microgrids and high voltage direct current (DC) transmission lines. She is pushing for utilities operators to find it easier to integrate renewables in homes.

References 

General Electric people
Year of birth missing (living people)
Living people
Portuguese engineers
University of Porto alumni